Derrick Doggett (born December 31, 1984 in San Diego, California) is a former gridiron football linebacker. He was signed by the Edmonton Eskimos as a street free agent in 2008. He played college football at Oregon State, after graduating from University City High School.

Doggett has also been a member of the Winnipeg Blue Bombers, Pittsburgh Steelers, and Carolina Panthers.

External links

Edmonton Eskimos bio
Winnipeg Blue Bombers bio
Just Sports Stats

1984 births
Living people
Players of American football from San Diego
Players of Canadian football from San Diego
American football linebackers
American players of Canadian football
Canadian football linebackers
Oregon State Beavers football players
Edmonton Elks players
Winnipeg Blue Bombers players
Pittsburgh Steelers players
Carolina Panthers players